L8R (pronounced later) was Norway's first boyband. The quartet consisted of teenagers Ray David (Raymond David Henriksen), Erik Kinn (Knut Eirik Kokkin), Kif Flinder (Christopher Flinder Petersen) and Chris Jensen (Christoffer Jensen).

History 

Originally put together by the label Tribe Records (NO) who was looking to build a group around young Henriksen whom they knew from several stage performances. In January 2002 an audition was made in the regions around Oslo, looking for boys who could sing but with an emphasis on dancing abilities. Out of several hundred hopefuls Kokkin, Petersen and Jensen were chosen. Many months of hard work followed, grooming the boys into what would become Norway's first boyband, with Henriksen as the main vocalist.

The origin of the band name came from the boys themselves. From the beginning they would often keep in touch through text messages, and used to end their messages with "c u l8r" (see you later), and thus the band name was born.

L8R described itself as "metal pop" and their music and style was tougher than what one normally expected from boybands. This became evident with their debut single in 2003, Back in Black, a cover of the classic AC/DC-song. Debuting at #4 on VG-lista, Norway's official music chart, it quickly sold to gold. Extensive touring and promoting followed, as well as two more singles; World of Pain and most notably In Da House. The latter produced by Swedish industrial rap metal group Clawfinger and based on their old hit The Truth. It reached #2 on the Norwegian charts and it too sold gold.

October 27, 2003, saw the release of their first and only album, Enter the Dragon.

L8R's tough image seemed to work well with kids around their own age, especially with girls in their early teens. The boys were also given credit for their well-rehearsed stage shows and continued to perform around Norway well into 2004. In July of that same year group member Petersen, an aspiring dancer, got into a prominent dance academy in Oslo and decided to leave the band. With the friendship being very tight-knit in the group, the other boys would not continue without their fourth member and they chose to split up.

Discography

Albums

 Enter the Dragon (2003)

Singles

 Back in Black (2003)
 World of Pain (2003)
 In Da House (2003)

External link 
Page at Norwegian Bandindex.no

Norwegian boy bands